Trøndelag County Municipality ( or ) is the democratically elected regional governing administration of Trøndelag county in Norway. The main responsibilities of the county municipality includes the running of 36 upper secondary schools, with 17,000 pupils. It administers thousands of kilometers of county roadways, public transport, dental care, culture, and cultural heritage.

County government
The Trøndelag county council is made up of 59 representatives that are elected every four years. The council essentially acts as a Parliament or legislative body for the county and it meets about six times each year. The council is divided into standing committees and an executive board which meet considerably more often. Both the council and executive board are led by the County Mayor.

County council
The party breakdown of the council is as follows:

Transport

Public transport in the county are operated on public service obligation contracts from the county municipality via the transportation authority company AtB AS (meaning A to B), and operations are performed by Boreal Buss, Nettbuss, Tide Buss and TrønderBilene (buses), Boreal Bane (tram), and Fosen Trafikklag and Kystekspressen (passenger ferries). County road are operated by the Norwegian Public Roads Administration, though managed by the county municipality.

Schools
The county operates 32 upper secondary schools in the county.

 Byåsen Upper Secondary School, Trondheim
 Charlottenlund Upper Secondary School, Trondheim
 Fosen Upper Secondary School
 Gauldal Upper Secondary School
 Grong Upper Secondary School
 Heimdal Upper Secondary School, Trondheim
 Hemne Upper Secondary School
 Hitra Upper Secondary School
 Inderøy Upper Secondary School
 Leksvik Upper Secondary School
 Levanger Upper Secondary School
 Malvik Upper Secondary School
 Meldal Upper Secondary School
 Melhus Upper Secondary School
 Meråker Upper Secondary School
 Mære Agriculture School
 Olav Duun Upper Secondary School
 Ole Vig Upper Secondary School
 Oppdal Upper Secondary School
 Orkdal Upper Secondary School
 Rissa Upper Secondary School
 Røros Upper Secondary School
 Selbu Upper Secondary School
 Skjetlein Upper Secondary School, Trondheim
 Steinkjer Upper Secondary School
 Strinda Upper Secondary School, Trondheim
 Thora Storm Upper Secondary School
 Tiller Upper Secondary School, Trondheim
 Trondheim Cathedral School
 Verdal Upper Secondary School
 Ytre Namdal Upper Secondary School
 Åfjord Upper Secondary School

References

 
Trøndelag
County municipalities of Norway
Public transport administrators of Norway
2018 establishments in Norway
Organisations based in Steinkjer